Eugene Hale (June 9, 1836October 27, 1918) was a Republican United States Senator from Maine.

Biography
Born in Turner, Maine, he was educated in local schools and at Maine's Hebron Academy. He was admitted to the bar in 1857 and served for nine years as prosecuting attorney for Hancock County, Maine. He was elected to the Maine Legislature 1867–68, to the U.S. House of Representatives 1869–79, serving in the 41st and four succeeding Congresses. He was an unsuccessful candidate for reelection in 1878 to the 46th Congress.

Hale was served as a member of the National Monetary Commission. He was also a member of the Delta Kappa Epsilon fraternity (Theta chapter).

Blaine faction politics

During the 1876 United States presidential election, Hale, along with future senatorial colleague William P. Frye, served as campaign managers for James G. Blaine at the Republican National Convention. Following the corrupt election that installed Republican Rutherford B. Hayes as president following the Compromise of 1877, Blaine, who supported Hayes in the general election, requested the nomination of a New England Republican into a cabinet officer position. At the house of John Sherman, Blaine called for President Hayes to nominate Frye as United States Attorney General. Hayes instead offered to appoint Hale to a cabinet position, countering Blaine's wishes to succeed senator Hannibal Hamlin with Hale.

Hale was a member of the Blaine section, acolytes of James G. Blaine who expressed antipathy towards policies pursued by President Hayes. The faction, a part of the conservative wing of the Republican Party, particularly opposed Hayes' nomination of staunch reformer Carl Schurz to the position of United States Secretary of the Interior.

Although he declined the post of United States Secretary of the Navy in the Rutherford B. Hayes administration (and had previously declined a Cabinet appointment under Ulysses S. Grant), Senator Hale performed constructive work of the greatest importance in the area of naval appropriations, especially during the early fights for the "new Navy." "I hope," he said in 1884, "that I shall not live many years before I shall see the American Navy what it ought to be, the pet of the American people." Much later in his career, he opposed the building of large numbers of capital ships, which he regarded as less effective in proportion to cost and subject to rapid obsolescence.

In the 1880 United States presidential election, Blaine once again sought the presidency. Hale and Frye once again became his lieutenants in the campaign. The Blaine faction came to blows with the "Stalwart" faction led by Roscoe Conkling, John A. Logan, and Simon Cameron, which advocated the nomination of former president Ulysses S. Grant for a third, non-consecutive presidential term. The irreconcilable bitterness between Conkling and Blaine fueled hostility between the two groups. Hale and Frye were described as "too amateurish and provincial" to sufficiently counter attacks by Conkling. The Blaine faction later formed an alliance with the "Half-Breed" faction to thwart the Stalwarts and nominate Ohio dark horse candidate James A. Garfield, who won the general election against Democratic opponent Winfield Scott Hancock.

In 1881, Hamlin resigned from the United States Senate. Hale, who left Congress following defeat at the hands of the Greenback Party previously in 1878, competed with Frye for the open seat. Due to Frye then having still retained his House seat in contrast to Hale not being office at the time, the latter was given the Senate post. Frye later succeeded Blaine to serve in the Senate, and the two became colleagues in the upper chamber.

Hale received an LL.D. from Bates College in 1882.  In 1883, Hale joined Hannibal E. Hamlin, the son of the former Vice President, and started the small law firm Hale & Hamlin in Ellsworth, Maine, which is now recognized as Maine's oldest law firm.

Senatorial career, later life
During the late 1890s, Hale and Senator George F. Hoar of Massachusetts were the most vocal opponents of American intervention into the ongoing insurrection in Cuba.  Hale disdained expansionism and jingoism and often challenged claims made by senators  on Cuban military victories and Spanish atrocities.  He so frequently engaged in verbal jousts with Cuban sympathizers in the Senate that they unfairly accused him of parroting Spanish propaganda and called him "The Senator from Spain."

Senator Hale retired from politics in 1911 and spent the remainder of his life in Ellsworth, Maine, and in Washington, D.C., where he died. He is buried in Woodbine Cemetery, Ellsworth, Maine.

Two ships were named USS Hale for him. He was the father of Frederick Hale, also a U.S. senator from Maine, and of diplomat Chandler Hale.

Gertrude Atherton's novel Senator North (1900) was based on Eugene Hale.

References

External links

 

  history.navy.mil: Biography of Eugene Hale
 Bio of Eugene Hale - United States Senator – The Lakeside Press via Online Biographies via Internet Archive

1836 births
1918 deaths
People from Turner, Maine
Hale family
Republican Party members of the United States House of Representatives from Maine
Republican Party United States senators from Maine
Republican Party members of the Maine House of Representatives
American prosecutors
People from Ellsworth, Maine
19th-century American politicians
Maine lawyers
Bates College alumni
19th-century American lawyers